Canarian Nationalist Left (INC) was a Canarian left-wing nationalist political party operating in the Canary Islands.

History
INC emerged from the Canarian Nationalist Autonomous Confederation (CANC), and splinter group of the Canarian People's Union (UPC). In the 1987 Canarian elections INC run in a coalition with Canarian Assembly, gaining 46,229 votos (6.96%) and 2 seats. Later in the same year both parties merged and created the Canarian Nationalist Alternative.

See also
 Canarian nationalism

References

Political parties in the Canary Islands
Defunct socialist parties in Spain
Political parties established in 1986
Defunct nationalist parties in Spain
1986 establishments in Spain
Canarian nationalist parties
Left-wing nationalist parties